The hampala barb (Hampala macrolepidota) is a relatively large southeast Asian species of cyprinid from the Mekong and Chao Phraya basins, as well as Peninsular Malaysia and the Greater Sundas (Borneo, Java and Sumatra). It prefers running rivers and streams, but can be seen in most freshwater habitats except torrents, small creeks and shallow swamps.

As food
This fish is one of the fish species that has been used as food in Southeast Asia since ancient times.

Although it is an important food fish, it remains abundant in at least parts of its range, resulting in a Least Concern rating by the IUCN.

References

Fish of Cambodia
Fish of Laos
Fish of Thailand
Fish of Malaysia
Fish of Indonesia
Cyprinid fish of Asia
Fish described in 1823
Taxa named by Johan Conrad van Hasselt